I Krig is the third album by the Norwegian black metal band Vreid.

Track listing
"Jarnbyrd" - 6:30
"Under Isen" - 3:35
"I Krig" - 8:40
"Væpna Lengsel" - 4:04
"Svart" - 3:54
"Folkefiendar" - 3:58
"Dei Daude Steig Av Grav" - 5:13
"Fangegard" - 3:58
"Millom Hav Og Fjell" - 5:15

References

2007 albums
Vreid albums